Chris Reed (July 7, 1989 – March 14, 2020) was an American-born Japanese ice dancer. With his sister Cathy Reed, he became a seven-time Japanese national champion (2008–2011, 2013–2015) and the 2011 Asian Winter Games silver medalist. They competed at two Winter Olympics (2010, 2014) and reached the final segment at nine ISU Championships.

With Kana Muramoto, Reed was the 2018 Four Continents bronze medalist, the 2017 Asian Winter Games silver medalist and a three-time Japanese national champion (2016–2018). They competed in the final segment at five ISU Championships and the 2018 Winter Olympics.

Early life 
Chris Reed was born in Kalamazoo, Michigan. His mother was Japanese and his father was American. Reed had two skating siblings: his elder sister, Cathy, with whom he competed in ice dancing; and his younger sister Allison Reed, who is also an ice dancer. The siblings grew up in Warren Township, New Jersey.
Reed acquired Japanese and American dual citizenship at birth until the age of 21, when he chose to retain Japanese citizenship, since Japanese nationality law only recognizes dual nationality until the age of 21.

Career

Partnership with Cathy Reed 
Chris and Cathy Reed initially began with singles skating, before deciding to skate together when Cathy was 12. They approached Shae-Lynn Bourne and she became their coach, along with Nikolai Morozov, who choreographed their first program. They trained in Hackensack, New Jersey. The Reeds won the novice ice dancing title at the 2006 U.S. Championships. They decided to represent Japan beginning in the 2006–07 season. While novice national champions are usually given a chance to compete on the Junior Grand Prix, Cathy Reed was too old at the time of their win to compete as a junior internationally. The Reeds accepted an offer to compete for Japan, advancing immediately to the senior level.

After advancing to the senior level, they placed fourth at the 2006 Golden Spin of Zagreb, and second at the 2007 Japan Championships behind Nozomi Watanabe and Akiyuki Kido. At the 2007 Four Continents, they placed 7th, ahead of several teams who had been competing as seniors much longer.

Reed underwent knee surgery twice after tearing the meniscus in his knee, and later tearing the medial collateral ligament. He was off the ice for five months.

Making their Grand Prix debut, the Reeds placed 9th at the 2007 Skate America and 8th at the 2007 NHK Trophy. They won the Japanese national championships. They repeated their 7th-place finish at the Four Continents, and then placed 16th at the 2008 Worlds. They represented Japan at the 2010 Winter Olympics in Vancouver, finishing in 17th place. They won the silver medal at the 2011 Asian Winter Games.

The Reeds finished 5th at both the NHK Trophy and Skate America during the 2012–13 season. They were named in the Japanese team to the 2014 Winter Olympics in Sochi, and 2015 Worlds, where they finished outside the top 20.

After the 2014–15 figure skating season, Cathy Reed retired from competitive figure skating.

2015–2016 season: Beginning of partnership with Muramoto 

On June 17, 2015, Reed and Kana Muramoto announced that they would compete together, coached by Marina Zueva, Oleg Epstein, and Massimo Scali in Canton, Michigan.

Making their international debut, Muramoto/Reed placed 7th at the 2015 NHK Trophy in November. The following month, they won the Japanese national title. In January 2016, the duo took silver at the Toruń Cup in Poland. They placed 7th at the 2016 Four Continents Championships in February in Taipei, Taiwan. In March, they placed 16th in the short dance, 14th in the free dance, and 15th overall at the 2016 World Championships in Boston, Massachusetts.

2016–2017 season

Muramoto/Reed won silver at the 2016 CS U.S. Classic in September with personal best scores, and placed 8th at the 2016 Skate America in October. They withdrew from the 2016 NHK Trophy due to a knee injury Reed suffered two weeks prior. After winning their second national title, the duo took bronze at the 2017 Toruń Cup.

In February, Muramoto/Reed placed 9th at the 2017 Four Continents Championships in Gangneung, South Korea, and won silver at the 2017 Asian Winter Games in Sapporo, Japan. In March, they placed 23rd in the short dance at the 2017 World Championships in Helsinki, Finland. As a result, they did not advance to the final segment and missed qualifying for the Olympics.

2017–2018 season

Muramoto/Reed began their season in September, taking bronze at the 2017 CS U.S. Classic. At the end of the month, they competed at the 2017 Nebelhorn Trophy, the final qualifying opportunity for the Olympics. The two won the silver medal and secured an Olympic spot for Japan. In November, they appeared at a pair of Grand Prix events, finishing 9th at the 2018 NHK Trophy and 7th at the 2017 Skate America. They then won their third national title, outscoring the silver medalists by nearly 17 points.

In January, Muramoto/Reed won the bronze medal at the 2018 Four Continents Championships in Taipei, Taiwan. In February, they competed at the 2018 Winter Olympics in PyeongChang, South Korea. They placed 15th in the short dance, 13th in the free dance, and 15th overall. The following month, they finished 11th at the 2018 World Championships in Milan, Italy, which was the best result of any Japanese ice team.

2018–2019 season

Muramoto/Reed were assigned to the 2018 NHK Trophy and 2018 Rostelecom Cup. However, on August 9, 2018, Japanese news media reported that they had ended their partnership. The Japanese federation confirmed the split, which Muramoto attributed to "differences in direction". Both Muramoto and Reed planned to seek new partners and continue competing. Reed posted a statement on his social media: "I am hugely disappointed with how this partnership has ended, but regardless I am in great physical condition now, I'm not done yet, I do plan on continuing the pursuit of achieving greater heights for Japan in ice dance. I would like to thank everyone involved, your support will never be forgotten and I will work even harder. And for Kana I wish her all the best in her future endeavors." On December 31, 2019, Reed announced his retirement.

Death 

On March 17, 2020, Reed's sister Allison announced on social media that he had died. The Japan Skating Federation confirmed Reed died in Detroit, Michigan, on March 14, 2020, due to sudden cardiac arrest. President of the JSF, Akihisa Nagashima paid tribute to him: "I am absolutely stunned by the sad news. I would like to offer my deepest appreciation to Chris Reed for his contribution to Japanese ice dancing over the years and extend condolences to his family. May Mr. Reed rest in peace."

A memorial service was held at a Michigan funeral home on March 21, 2020, and was publicly live-streamed on numerous platforms. Reed's sister Cathy paid tribute to him in both Japanese and English: "I miss your voice. I miss your big smile. I miss holding your hand. But I'll be strong for you, Chris."

Programs

With Kana Muramoto

With Cathy Reed

Competitive highlights 
GP: Grand Prix; CS: Challenger Series; JGP: Junior Grand Prix

With Kana Muramoto for Japan

With Cathy Reed for Japan

With Cathy Reed for the United States

References

External links 

 
 Cathy Reed & Chris Reed official blog

1989 births
2020 deaths
American male ice dancers
Japanese male ice dancers
Figure skaters at the 2010 Winter Olympics
Figure skaters at the 2014 Winter Olympics
Figure skaters at the 2018 Winter Olympics
Olympic figure skaters of Japan
Japanese people of American descent
People from Warren Township, New Jersey
Sportspeople from Kalamazoo, Michigan
Sportspeople from Somerset County, New Jersey
American sportspeople of Japanese descent
Asian Games medalists in figure skating
Figure skaters at the 2011 Asian Winter Games
Figure skaters at the 2017 Asian Winter Games
Medalists at the 2011 Asian Winter Games
Medalists at the 2017 Asian Winter Games
Asian Games silver medalists for Japan
Four Continents Figure Skating Championships medalists